Saint-Simon-de-Rimouski is a municipality in the Les Basques Regional County Municipality in the Bas-Saint-Laurent region of Quebec, Canada.  Its population in the Canada 2011 Census was 438. Before 2020 it was known as Saint-Simon.

Demographics

Population

Language

See also
 List of municipalities in Quebec

References

External links

Municipalities in Quebec
Incorporated places in Bas-Saint-Laurent